Tommy Andersson (born 30 January 1964) is a retired Swedish football defender.

References

1964 births
Living people
Swedish footballers
Halmstads BK players
Association football defenders
Allsvenskan players